Bokermannohyla ibitipoca is a species of frog in the family Hylidae.
It is endemic to Parque Estadual do Ibitipoca, Brazil.
Its natural habitats are subtropical or tropical moist montane forests and rivers. It is threatened by habitat degradation for touristic activities.

Sources
 

Bokermannohyla
Endemic fauna of Brazil
Amphibians described in 1990
Taxonomy articles created by Polbot